Events in the year 1765 in Norway.

Incumbents
Monarch: Frederick V

Events
18 April — Strilekrigen in Bergen.

Arts and literature
8 October — Bergen Philharmonic Orchestra was founded.

Births
11 February – Ole Rasmussen Apeness, district sheriff, soldier, and farmer (died 1859)

Full date unknown
Knut Andreas Pettersen Agersborg, politician (died 1847)
Niels Stockfleth Darre, military officer (died 1809)
Mathias Hagerup, politician (died 1822)
Osmund Andersen Lømsland, farmer and politician (died 1841)

Deaths

9 January – Christian Ancher, merchant, timber trader and ship owner (born 1711).
21 January – Christian Braunmann Tullin, businessman and poet (born 1728).

See also

References